DeRobigne Mortimer Bennett (December 23, 1818 – December 6, 1882), best known as D. M. Bennett, was the founder and publisher of Truth Seeker, a radical freethought and reform American periodical.

Biography

Shaker Life
Derobigne M. Bennett and his sister, Letsy Ann, were admitted as Shakers in New Lebanon, New York, in 1834. Living in the Church Family's First Order, he worked as a shoemaker, boys' caretaker, herbalist, physician, and scribe, writing part of the Journal of Inspirational Meetings in 1840 before his questioning nature became evident. His life with the Shakers ended in 1846 when he eloped with Mary Wicks at the same time his sister Letsy Ann Bennett eloped with John Allen, all four of them slipping away from the Shaker village unnoticed.

Freethinker
After leaving the Shakers, Bennett evolved into a "freethinker", founding the Truth Seeker newspaper with his wife Mary Wicks Bennett in 1873. In 1878, Bennett wrote that "Jesuism", rather than Pauline Christianity, was the gospel taught by Peter, John and James.

On 1 September 1873, D. M. and M. W. Bennett released the first tabloid edition of Truth Seeker. Its masthead announced its purpose:

Truth Seeker was extreme for its times, and it persists to this day though in self-resuscitating form. D. M. Bennett is interred at Green-Wood Cemetery in Brooklyn, New York. His monument, erected by his fellow freethinkers, is covered with his statements.

Bennett was the subject of the biography D. M. Bennett: The Truth Seeker (2006) by Roderick Bradford and a 2009 documentary.

Obscenity prosecution
United States Postal Inspector Anthony Comstock had Bennett arrested on December 10, 1878, for mailing Cupid's Yokes, a free-love pamphlet. Bennett was prosecuted, subjected to a widely publicized trial, and imprisoned in the Albany Penitentiary for thirteen months, in which his health greatly suffered. Despite a strong campaign in his favor for President Rutherford B. Hayes to pardon him, Hayes declined, pardoning the actual author (Ezra Heywood) instead.

Publications

An Open Letter to Jesus Christ (1875)
The World's Sages, Thinkers and Reformers (1876)
Thirty Discussions, Bible Stories: Essays and Lectures (1876)
Interrogatories to Jehovah (1878)
The Champions of the Church: Their Crimes and Persecutions (1878)
Answers to Christian Questions and Arguments (1880)
The Gods and Religions of Ancient and Modern Times (1880)
A Truth Seeker in Europe (1881)
A Truth Seeker Around the World (1882)
The Semitic Gods and the Bible  (1912)

References
 Brooklyn's Green-Wood Cemetery: New York's Buried Treasure by Jeffrey I. Richman

Further reading
Bradford, Roderick (2006).  D. M. Bennett: The Truth Seeker (New York: Prometheus Books). 
Jacoby, Susan (2004). Freethinkers: A History of American Secularism (New York: Metropolitan Books).

External links
 D. M. Bennett: The Truth Seeker (2009) - 1 hour video documentary by Roderick Bradford
 The Truth Seeker
 Green-Wood Cemetery Burial Search
 

1818 births
1882 deaths
American secularists
Freethought writers
Burials at Green-Wood Cemetery
19th-century American newspaper publishers (people)
19th-century American journalists
American male journalists
19th-century American male writers
Former Shakers